First-seeded Martina Navratilova was the defending champion and won in the final 6–2, 6–2 against Chris Evert. This was the 80th and the last time these two legends faced each other in a professional match with Navratilova ending the rivalry 43–37 in her favour.

Seeds
A champion seed is indicated in bold text while text in italics indicates the round in which that seed was eliminated. The top four seeds received a bye to the second round.

  Martina Navratilova (champion)
  Chris Evert (final)
  Gabriela Sabatini (quarterfinals)
  Manuela Maleeva (semifinals)
  Helena Suková (semifinals)
  Natasha Zvereva (second round)
  Zina Garrison (quarterfinals)
  Claudia Kohde-Kilsch (first round)

Draw

Final

Section 1

Section 2

See also
 Evert–Navratilova rivalry

References
 1988 Virginia Slims of Chicago Draw

Ameritech Cup
1988 WTA Tour